Giorgio Ballati (born 2 April 1946) is a retired Italian sprinter who won a bronze medal in the 4 × 400 m relay at the 1975 Mediterranean Games. He competed at the 1972 Olympics in the 400 m hurdles, but failed to reach the final.

References

External links
 

1946 births
Living people
Italian male hurdlers
Olympic athletes of Italy
Athletes (track and field) at the 1972 Summer Olympics
Mediterranean Games bronze medalists for Italy
Athletes (track and field) at the 1975 Mediterranean Games
Mediterranean Games medalists in athletics